M. Krishnan Nair may refer to:

 M. Krishnan Nair (author) (1923–2006), Indian Malayalam literary critic and orator
 M. Krishnan Nair (doctor) (1939–2021), Indian oncologist, director of the Regional Cancer Centre in Thiruvananthapuram, Kerala
 M. Krishnan Nair (director) (1917–2001), Indian film director of Malayalam films
 M. Krishnan Nair (politician) (1870–1938), Indian politician, member of Madras Legislative Council

See also
 Kalamandalam Krishnan Nair (1914–1990), Kathakali artist